William Francis Robinson AO (born 16 April 1936) is an Australian painter and lithographer.

Early life 
William Robinson was born in Brisbane in 1936, and studied art at Ballarat High School from 1950 to 1953. After graduating, he began working as an art instructor.

Robinson commenced national service on 4 January 1955 with the Royal Australian Air Force serving as an Aircraftsman, service number: A115716.

In his teaching career, Robinson eventually became head of the Painting Department at the Brisbane College of Advanced Education in 1982. In 1989 he retired to work full-time on his paintings.

Artistic Career
Robinson held his first solo exhibition at the Design Arts Centre, Brisbane in 1967. He rose to international prominence as a part of the exhibitions Australian Perspecta in 1983 and The Sixth Bienniale of Sydney in 1986.

The Metropolitan Museum of Art has several of his works in their collection, as does the National Gallery of Australia and several smaller Australian galleries.

He has won the Archibald Prize for portraiture twice: first in 1987 for Equestrian self portrait, then in 1995 for Self-portrait with stunned mullet. He has also won the Wynne Prize for landscape painting in 1990 (The rainforest) and 1996 (Creation landscape – earth and sea).

Robinson released a solo exhibition, Landscapes, which consisted of oil paintings showing fragments of the Australian bush in various perspectives.

In 2009 Robinson was the subject of a documentary by filmmaker Catherine Hunter.  "William Robinson: A Painter’s Journey" traces the places that have inspired the artist, from his early farmyard paintings to the 'Creation Landscape' series and, most recently, the quiet still life paintings inspired by the intimate surroundings of his Brisbane house and garden.

In 2011, The Queensland University of Technology (QUT) Art Museum curated a major retrospective exhibition William Robinson: The Transfigured Landscape which was opened by the Australian Governor General Quentin Bryce. There is an art gallery within Old Government House on the QUT's Garden Point campus devoted to Robinson's art, featuring many of his artworks, including some of his very first.

In 2016 William Robinson was interviewed in a digital story and oral history for the State Library of Queensland's James C Sourris AM Collection. In the interview Robinson talks to Vanessa Van Ooyen, Director QUT Art Museum about his art, his success at winning the Archibald Prize and his busy life as both a teacher and an artist.

References

External links
William Robinson digital story, educational interview and oral history. John Oxley Library, State Library of Queensland, 6 February 2016. 7min, 30min and 2:10 hour version available to view online.
William Robinson at the Queensland Art Gallery
Equestrian self portrait, winner of the 1987 Archibald Prize
Self-portrait with stunned mullet, winner of the 1995 Archibald Prize
Creation landscape – earth and sea, winner of the 1996 Wynne Prize
Professor John Robinson and brother William 1992
Grafico Topico's reviews of William Robinson's art

1936 births
Living people
20th-century Australian painters
20th-century Australian male artists
Archibald Prize winners
Officers of the Order of Australia
People educated at Brisbane State High School
Wynne Prize winners
Queensland Greats
Australian male painters